Bromic acid, also known as hydrogen bromate, is an oxoacid with the molecular formula HBrO3. It only exists in aqueous solution. It is a colorless solution that turns yellow at room temperature as it decomposes to bromine. Bromic acid and bromates are powerful oxidizing agents and are common ingredients in Belousov–Zhabotinsky reactions.  Belousov-Zhabotinsky reactions are a classic example of non-equilibrium thermodynamics.

Dissociation
Low concentrations dissociate completely to hydronium and bromate while high concentrations decompose to form bromine.  Bromic acid's high instability can be explained because the positively charged hypervalent bromine is connected to the electronegative OH group.

Structure
There are several isomers of HBrO3.  The calculated bond lengths are listed below based on three high level theories G2MP2, CCSD(T), and QCISD(T).

The large energy barriers between these structures do not make isomerization possible.  HOBrO2 is the most stable isomer and is the one pictured above.

Synthesis

Bromic acid is the product of a reaction of barium bromate and sulfuric acid.

 

Barium sulfate is insoluble in water and forms a precipitate. The aqueous bromic acid can be decanted removing the barium sulfate.

References

Bromates
Halogen oxoacids
Mineral acids
Oxidizing acids